Don is a commune in the Nord department in northern France.

See also
Communes of the Nord department

References

External links

Official website

Communes of Nord (French department)
French Flanders